The Sawtooth Range is a mountain range of the Rocky Mountains in central Idaho, United States, reaching a maximum elevation of  at the summit of Thompson Peak. It encompasses an area of  spanning parts of Custer, Boise, Blaine, and Elmore counties, and is bordered to the east by the Sawtooth Valley. Much of the mountain range is within the Sawtooth Wilderness, part of the Sawtooth National Recreation Area and Sawtooth National Forest.

The mountains were named for their jagged peaks.

Peaks

Climbs range in difficulty between the  Observation Peak, a Class 1 hike, and  King Spire, a rock route rated Class 5.10 on the Yosemite Decimal System.

Geology
The northern Sawtooth Range formed from the Eocene Sawtooth batholith, while south of Alturas Lake the mountains formed from the Cretaceous granodiorite of the Idaho Batholith. The Sawtooth Range has a history of alpine glaciation, but while no surface glaciers exist today, perennial snow fields and rock glaciers remain, usually on north or east facing slopes. There have been 202 perennial snow fields mapped in the Sawtooth Range.  The Sawtooth Range was last extensively glaciated in the Pleistocene, but glaciers probably existed during the Little Ice Age, which ended around 1850 AD. Evidence of past glaciation given remnants of the glaciers such as glacial lakes, moraines, horns, hanging valleys, cirques, and arêtes.

Seismology
In 2010, scientists from Idaho State University discovered the Sawtooth Fault near the base of the mountains, running for  near Stanley and Redfish Lake.  The most recent large quakes along it occurred around 4,000 and 7,000 years ago. It is estimated the fault could produce a 7.5 magnitude earthquake, potentially felt as far as Boise.

Waterways

The Sawtooth Range is home to hundreds of lakes created by vanished alpine glaciers, with nearly 400 lakes in the Sawtooth Wilderness. Five of the six largest lakes in the range are located outside the wilderness (Redfish, Alturas, Pettit, Yellow Belly, and Stanley lakes), while Sawtooth Lake is within the wilderness.

Most of the east side of the Sawtooth Range is drained by the main stem of the Salmon River and the west side by the South Fork Payette River. Small portions of the northern and southern ends of the range are in the watersheds of the Middle Fork Salmon River and Boise River, respectively.

Recreation
Additional trails traverse the foothills of the mountains outside the designated wilderness. Camping is permitted anywhere in the wilderness. There are several developed campgrounds on the western side of range, outside the Sawtooth Wilderness, including at Redfish, Little Redfish, Alturas, Pettit, and Stanley lakes, as well as at Iron Creek. Restrictions on fires and animals apply in some areas.

See also

Sawtooth National Recreation Area
Lakes of the Sawtooth Mountains (Idaho)
Sawtooth National Forest
 List of mountain ranges in Idaho
 List of mountains of Idaho
 List of mountain peaks of Idaho

References

External links

Sawtooth National Forest - official website

 
Ranges of the Rocky Mountains
Mountain ranges of Idaho
Salmon-Challis National Forest
Sawtooth National Forest
Sawtooth Wilderness
Landforms of Custer County, Idaho
Landforms of Boise County, Idaho
Landforms of Elmore County, Idaho
Landforms of Blaine County, Idaho